The Vatican post office has operated its own postal service and issued its own postage stamps since 1929.

The postal history of Vatican City begins shortly after its official foundation on 11 February 1929. Two days later, the Vatican post office began operating with supplies and equipment donated by the Italian government. Vatican City became a member of the Universal Postal Union on 1 June, and then on 29 July Vatican City and Italy signed a postal agreement, going into effect on 1 August, providing for the routing of its mail through Rome.

First stamps
The first of August also saw the issuance of the first Vatican stamps (Italian stamps were used previously), in the "Conciliation" definitive series of 15 values. The low values, 5 to 75 centesmi, depicted the heraldic arms, while the higher values (80 centesmi to 10 lira) featured a full-face portrait of the reigning Pope Pius XI.

Later issues
On 1 April 1933, the Vatican issued its first semi-postal stamps, a set of four marking the 24th Holy Year. On 31 May of the same year, the "Gardens and Medallions" definitives were issued. While the lowest value still depicted the coat of arms, higher values included views of the gardens and of St Peter's.

On 18 February 1939, just a little after Pius XI's death on 10 February, the arms stamps of 1929 were overprinted "SEDE VACANTE / MCMXXXIX". They remained valid until 3 March, the day after the election of Pope Pius XII.

Today
The Vatican has acquired a reputation for producing handsome and attractive issues in limited quantities (even today, the average production run for most issues is only between 300,000 and 500,000 stamps).  Vatican stamps are produced under the authority of the Philatelic and Numismatic Office of the Vatican City State.

Much, but by no means all, of the mail handled by the Vatican is from tourists or official congregations of the Roman Curia.  Many Romans, distrustful of the unreliable Italian post office, make weekly trips to the Vatican just to post their important letters.  Italian stamps may not be used on Vatican mail nor vice versa. According to the Universal Postal Union, the Vatican post office is "one of the best postal systems in the world" and "more letters are sent each year, per inhabitant, from the Vatican's 00120 postal code than from anywhere else in the world."

See also
 Poste Vaticane
 List of people on the postage stamps of Vatican City
 Index of Vatican City-related articles

References and sources
Notes

Sources
 Bolaffi catalog
 Michel catalog
 Sassone catalog
 Unificato catalog

Further reading
 Antonellis, Albert A. Postal cards and aerogrammes of the Vatican City State, 1929-2007. Waltham, MA.: A.A. Antonellis, 2008 CD-ROM.
 Bolaffi's Roman States and Vatican City specialized stamp catalogue. Turin: S.C.O.T. Editrice, 1958–79.
 I francobolli dello Stato della Citta del Vaticano = Stamps of the Vatican City State. Citta del Vaticano: Governatorato S.C.V. Vol. 1: 1929-1976 (1977); Vol. 2: 1977-1980 (1981); Vol. 3: 1981-1986 (1986)
 Heutger, Nicolaus C. Vatikanische Briefmarken: Kunst und Geschichte. Göttingen: Philapress, 1966 66p.
 Kehr, Ernest A. Vatican: the stamps and a description of their design and background prepared especially for stamp collectors. Newark, N.J.: Washington Press, 1956 48p.
 Kelen, Emery. Stamps tell the story of the Vatican. New York: Meredith Press, 1969 132p.
 Pirozzi, Greg and James C. Hamilton. Vatican City collecting basics: a comprehensive introduction for collectors. Hanover, MD.: Vatican Philatelic Society, 2014 27p.

External links
 Vatican Philatelic Society
 VatiStamps Yahoo Discussion Group

Communications in Vatican City
Philately of Italy